Covariance and contravariance may refer to:
 Covariance and contravariance of vectors, in mathematics and theoretical physics
 Covariance and contravariance of functors, in category theory
 Covariance and contravariance (computer science), whether a type system preserves the ordering ≤ of types

See also
 Covariance, in probability theory and statistics, the measure of how much two random variables vary together 
 Covariance (disambiguation)